Ape Parish is an administrative unit of Smiltene Municipality, Latvia. It was created in 2010 from the countryside territory of Ape town. At the beginning of 2014, the population of the parish was 542.

Towns, villages and settlements of Ape parish 
 Dauškāni
 Grūbe
 Uskani

References 

Parishes of Latvia
Smiltene Municipality
Vidzeme